Ben-Zvi is a Jewish surname of Hebrew origin, meaning "son of [a] deer", and may refer to:

 David Ben-Zvi (born 1974), Israeli-American mathematician
 Eva Ben-Zvi (b. 1947), Lithuania-born Israeli soprano
 Rachel Yanait Ben-Zvi (1886–1979), Israeli educator, organizer and author
 Shaul Ben-Zvi, the Israeli name of Paul Shulman, former chief of the Israel Navy
Tova Ben Zvi (born 1928), Israeli singer
 Yitzhak Ben-Zvi (1884–1963), President of Israel
 Zeev Ben-Zvi (1904–1952), Israeli sculptor

See also 
 Zvi (disambiguation)

Jewish surnames
Hebrew-language surnames